Compsolechia picticornis is a moth of the family Gelechiidae. It was described by Walsingham in 1897. It is found in the West Indies, where it has been recorded from St. Croix and Puerto Rico.

The wingspan is about 10 mm. The forewings are brownish fuscous, evenly speckled and mottled with ashy grey throughout and with a faint indication of a dark spot beyond the middle of the fold and groups of ashy-grey scales around the termen at the base of the ashy-grey cilia, through which run a slender dark dividing line beyond their middle. The hindwings are pale chestnut-grey.

References

Moths described in 1897
Compsolechia